is a Japanese politician who served as Minister of Reconstruction from October 2021 to August 2022. A member of the Liberal Democratic Party, he also serves in the House of Representatives representing Okinawa’s 4th District since 2012. 

A native of Chinen and graduate of Sophia University, he was elected to the assembly of Okinawa Prefecture for the first time in 1988 and to the Diet for the first time in 2003. His father is Junji Nishime, former governor of Okinawa Prefecture, and his brother is Junshiro Nishime, a former member of the House of Councilors in the Diet.

References 
  NB: This source incorrectly states that his name is Kozaburo.

External links 
 

Members of the House of Representatives (Japan)
Sophia University alumni
Living people
1954 births
Liberal Democratic Party (Japan) politicians
21st-century Japanese politicians
Politicians from Okinawa Prefecture
Japanese politicians of Ryukyuan descent
Government ministers of Japan